Viktor Ivanovych Oparenyuk (born 23 March 1969) is a former Ukrainian football player.

References

1969 births
Living people
Soviet footballers
FC Nyva Vinnytsia players
FC CSKA Kyiv players
Ukrainian footballers
FC Zhemchuzhina Sochi players
Ukrainian expatriate footballers
Expatriate footballers in Russia
Russian Premier League players
FC Volgar Astrakhan players
FC Krystal Chortkiv players
FC Shakhter Karagandy players
Expatriate footballers in Kazakhstan
FC Okzhetpes players
Expatriate footballers in Germany

Association football defenders